The 1999 Barber Dodge Pro Series season was the fourteenth season of the series. All cars are Dodge powered, Michelin shod, Reynard 98E chassis.

Race calendar and results

In season testing

The Barber Dodge Pro Series conducted a three-day test at the 1 mile oval of Phoenix International Raceway. It was the first time since 1996 the series visited an oval. It was the first time the in 1998 introduced Michelin shod Reynard 98E visited an oval track. Many drivers, such as Sepp Koster, had never driven on an oval before. John McCaig was the only driver who also competed in the 1996 Nazareth Speedway Barber Pro Series race. Defending series champion Jeff Simmons was the fastest driver over the three-day test driving an average lap of 129.042mph (207.67km/h). The test was a preparation for the 60-lap race at Nazareth where the series supported the First Union 200, a NASCAR Busch Grand National Series race.

Final standings

References

Barber Dodge Pro Series
1999 in American motorsport